The Southern Virginia Knights  men's basketball team is an NCAA Division III college basketball team competing in the USA South Athletic Conference. Home games are played at the Knight Sports Arena, located on the Southern Virginia University's campus in Buena Vista.

The team is currently coached by Adam Wardenburg, hired on May 17, 2019.

History

Classifications

Conference Memberships

Notes

Season-by-Season Results

USCAA

NCAA Division III
Southern Virginia records season by season since joining Division III in 2013.

Notes

References

External links
 Official Website of Southern Virginia Knights Athletics

basketball, men's